Ann-Marie Gallagher is an author, historian, feminist, witch, and a former senior lecturer at the University of Central Lancashire (UCLan) in England. She has written extensively on her subjects, and appears often on British radio. For years she has been practising, teaching, and broadcasting on witchcraft, Pagan and goddess spirituality, women's studies, magic, gender, and folklore. Her books include Inner Magic: A Guide to Witchcraft, The Way of the Goddess and The Spells Bible: The Definitive Guide to Charms and Enchantments. She was a course leader for Sociology at UCLan in Preston, England. She is married and has three children, and lives in Lancashire, England with her husband.

Bibliography 
 Inner Magic: A Guide to Witchcraft by Ann-Marie Gallagher (1 April 2007) MITCH , 
 Magical Spells for Your Home: How to Bring Magic into Every Area of Your Life  by Ann-Marie Gallagher (13 October 2002) Collins & Brown , 
 Re-presenting the Past: Women and History by Ann-Marie Gallagher, Cathy Lubelska, and Louise Ryan (24 July 2001) Longman , 
 Spellcraft: Practical Spells for Modern Life by Ann-Marie Gallagher (9 October 2001) Penguin (Non-Classics) , 
 The Spells Bible: The Definitive Guide to Charms and Enchantments by Ann-Marie Gallagher (29 August 2003) Walking Stick Press , 
 Thorsons Way of the Goddess by Ann Marie Gallagher (2000) Thorsons , 
 The Wicca Bible: The Definitive Guide to Magic and the Craft by Ann-Marie Gallagher (1 August 2005) Sterling ,

Contributed to 
 Daughters of the Goddess: Studies of Healing, Identity, and Empowerment by Wendy Griffin (1999) SAGE Publications Ltd

Articles 
 Weaving a Tangled Web?: Pagan Ethics and Issues of History, "Race" and Ethnicity in Pagan Identity – Article in Discus Vol. 6 (2000)
 Woven Apart & Weaving Together: Conflict and Mutuality in Feminist and Pagan Communities in Britain (1999)

Notes 

Living people
Year of birth missing (living people)
English occult writers
English Wiccans
English religious writers
Wiccan feminists
Women religious writers
20th-century British non-fiction writers
20th-century English women writers
21st-century British non-fiction writers
21st-century English women writers
English women non-fiction writers